The 2017 British Indoor Athletics Championships was a national track and field competition for British athletes, held on 11 and 12 February 2017 at the English Institute of Sport in Sheffield, England. The event served as the team trials for the 2017 European Athletics Indoor Championships. Racewalker Tom Bosworth gave the highlight performance of the meeting, breaking the British record for the 5000 metres walk at 18:39.47 minutes

Medal summary

Men 

 Norwegian athlete Fredrik Vaeng Røtnes competed as a guest in the 5000 m walk and placed third in 20:51.15 minutes.

Women

 Italian Giulia Viola competed as a guest in the 3000 m race and placed third.

References 
 The Power of 10 - British Athletics Indoor Team Trials External Results Sheffield 11-12 Feb 17

British Indoor Championships
British Indoor Athletics Championships
Sports competitions in Sheffield
Athletics Indoor
Athletics competitions in England